Nikolay Vladimirovich Melnikov (born ) is a Russian wheelchair curler.

Teams

References

External links 

 (video inside)

Living people
1964 births
Sportspeople from Yekaterinburg
Russian male curlers
Russian wheelchair curlers
Russian curling champions